Do not Panic, Major Kardos is a 1982 Hungarian comedy film.

Cast 
 István Bujtor - Ötvös Csöpi
 András Kern - Dr. Kardos
 László Bánhidi - Matuska 
 Gyula Bodrogi - Boros
 Gábor Koncz - Gengszterfõnök
  - Pötyi

References

External links 

1980s crime action films
Films set in Lake Balaton
Hungarian comedy films